Carlos Mario Carbonero Mancilla (born 25 July 1990) is a Colombian footballer who plays as a midfielder for Ferro Carril Oeste. Between 2011 and 2014, he earned five caps with the Colombia national team.

Club career

Colombia
Carbonero began his career in the Categoría Primera B with Academia before signing for first division team Atletico Huila.

In January 2011, it was confirmed that Carbonero would join Once Caldas.

Argentina
Eventually, he signed for Estudiantes in 2011. He would only make 10 league appearances before going on loan to Arsenal de Sarandí. He scored his first goal for Arsenal in the 2012 edition of the Copa Libertadores in 3–0 win against Zamora. He netted a goal in the 2012 Tornero Clausura against San Martín in an away game that ended 4–1 in favour of Arsenal. At the end of season Arsenal won the 2012 Tornero Clausura, its first league title in history. In the 2012 Supercopa Argentina, Carbonero failed to score in the penalty shoot-out against Boca Juniors but despite this, Arsenal were still able to beat Boca 4–3 thus claiming the title.

On 4 June 2013, it was confirmed that Carbonero would go on loan once more, this time to play for Argentine River Plate.

Sampdoria
On 27 August 2015, Carbonero joined Sampdoria on loan with the option of a permanent move given to the club. On 31 August 2016, Sampdoria loaned him for a second time.

International career
Carbonero made his first appearance for Colombia in 2011. In 2014, he was named the surprising late replacement for Aldo Leão Ramírez for Colombia's 2014 FIFA World Cup squad by José Pékerman. He played in one match (45 minutes versus Japan).

Honours
 Arsenal de Sarandi
 Argentine Primera División (1): 2012 Clausura
 Supercopa Argentina: 2012

 River Plate
 Argentine Primera División (1): Torneo Final 2014
 Argentine Super Liga Final (1): 2014

External links

References

1990 births
Living people
Colombian footballers
Colombia international footballers
Association football defenders
Academia F.C. players
Atlético Huila footballers
Once Caldas footballers
Estudiantes de La Plata footballers
Arsenal de Sarandí footballers
Club Atlético River Plate footballers
A.C. Cesena players
U.C. Sampdoria players
Centro Atlético Fénix players
Deportivo Cali footballers
Ferro Carril Oeste footballers
Cortuluá footballers
Categoría Primera A players
Categoría Primera B players
Argentine Primera División players
Serie A players
Colombian expatriate footballers
Colombian expatriate sportspeople in Argentina
Colombian expatriate sportspeople in Italy
Expatriate footballers in Argentina
Expatriate footballers in Italy
2014 FIFA World Cup players
Footballers from Bogotá
Colombian people of African descent